The 2010–11 Zamalek SC season is a special season for Zamalek's fans, who will be celebrating the 100th year of their club and hoping to achieve a championship title since winning Egypt Cup competition in 2008. It is also the second season for the Egyptian manager Hossam Hassan, who managed to improve the team's performance in the previous season ending up the Premier League a runner-up. Zamalek will be also sharing in the 2011 CAF Champions League and will be looking to add a sixth title.

Current squad

 *

Players Under 21

Out on loan

Transfers

In

Out

Competitions

Egyptian Premier League

Egypt Cup 

Zamalek's score placed first.

Cairo derby 
Ended with draw 0-0

Matches

Egyptian Premier League

Statistics

Appearances

Goal Scorers

References
 2010-11 season of Egyptian Premier League.
 Zamalek SC page on FilGoal.

Zamalek SC seasons
Zamalek